Hamadasuchus is an extinct genus of sebecian crocodylomorph. Fossils have been found from the Kem Kem Formation outcropping in southeastern Morocco. These beds date back to the Albian and Cenomanian stages of the Late Cretaceous. It was first assigned to the family Trematochampsidae. Diagnostic features of the genus include its lateromedially compressed and serrated teeth. It was deep-snouted and had a slightly heterodont dentition with three distinct tooth morphologies present from sections of the lower jaw.

References

External links
Hamadasuchus in the Paleobiology Database

Late Cretaceous crocodylomorphs of Africa
Terrestrial crocodylomorphs
Peirosaurids
Prehistoric pseudosuchian genera
Cretaceous Morocco
Fossil taxa described in 1994